The second season of That's So Raven aired on Disney Channel from October 3, 2003 to September 24, 2004. The season deals with the Baxter family, Raven (Raven-Symoné), Cory (Kyle Massey), Tanya Baxter (T'Keyah Crystal Keymáh) and Victor Baxter (Rondell Sheridan) as they continue to manage with Raven and her ability to see into the future. Orlando Brown and Anneliese van der Pol co-star as Raven's best friends, Eddie Thomas and Chelsea Daniels. 

Guest stars for this season included: Rose Abdoo, Paula Abdul, Adrienne Bailon, Patrick Bristow, Haylie Duff, Ashley Eckstein, Judyann Elder, David Henrie, Amy Hill, Lawrence Hilton-Jacobs, Jonathan McDaniel, Faizon Love, Wesley Mann, Tom Virtue, and Debra Wilson.

In 2004, this season's original opening was replaced with season three's opening for daytime network rebroadcasts and subsequent syndication without any explanation, making the original opening rare. The original opening was retained for Disney+.

Production
This season was filmed from April 7, 2003 to October 2003.

Cast
Raven-Symoné as Raven Baxter
Orlando Brown as Eddie Thomas 
Anneliese van der Pol as Chelsea Daniels 
Kyle Massey as Cory Baxter
T'Keyah Crystal Keymáh as Tanya Baxter 
Rondell Sheridan as Victor Baxter

Episodes

 This season consists of 22 episodes.

References

2003 American television seasons
2004 American television seasons
Season 2